The Flesh and the Fiends (US title Mania) is a 1960 British horror film directed by John Gilling. It stars Peter Cushing as 19th-century medical doctor Robert Knox, who purchases human corpses for research from a murderous pair named Burke and Hare (George Rose and Donald Pleasence). The film is based on the true case of Burke and Hare, who murdered at least 16 people in 1828 Edinburgh, Scotland and sold their bodies for anatomical research.

Plot
In 1828 Edinburgh, Scotland, Dr. Knox (Peter Cushing) is a highly skilled anatomist who draws large crowds of medical students to his lectures on the human body. Though he is constantly at odds with his stuffy, backwards colleagues, he is highly venerated by his students and believes his duty is to push the medical profession forward. Unfortunately, due to the laws of the time very few cadavers are legally available to the medical profession, necessitating the use of graverobbers or "Resurrection men" to procure additional specimens. Dr. Knox's assistant Dr. Mitchell (Dermot Walsh) and a young student named Jackson (John Cairney) are given the task of buying the bodies, which are worth a small fortune... especially when fresh.

Meanwhile, drunken miscreants William Burke (George Rose) and William Hare (Donald Pleasence) discover that a lodger at Burke's boarding house has died still owing £4 in rent. When they find that the body can make them a handsome profit, they begin a career of murdering locals and selling them to the medical school. When Jackson goes to a local tavern to give Burke and Hare their pay, he becomes involved with tempestuous local prostitute Mary Patterson (Billie Whitelaw), who is also well known to the killers.

Over time, Jackson and Mitchell begin to suspect that the bodies supplied by Burke and Hare are victims of foul play. Despite their concerns, Dr. Knox dismisses any attempt at going to the police. When Jackson's new girlfriend Mary becomes their latest victim, Jackson discovers her body in the lecture room and he too is killed when he confronts the murderous duo. When they murder a well-known mentally ill youth (Melvyn Hayes), however, they quickly become murder suspects and are caught by an angry mob. Hare agrees to turn King's Evidence against his former partner and is set free, though vindictive locals catch him and burn out his eyes. Burke is executed by hanging, still complaining that Dr. Knox never paid him for the final body.

Knox, for his part in the killings, is the object of widespread public outrage, but ultimately not punished or censured by his colleagues (to whom Dr. Mitchell eloquently defends him). Though he is free to continue lecturing, he ultimately feels guilt over his part in the horrors, admitting to his devoted niece Martha (June Laverick) that the murder victims "seemed so small in my scheme of things. But I knew how they died." The film ends with Knox, who assumes his lectures will now be empty, instead finding himself greeted with applause from a packed hall of students. Apparently a changed man, he begins his lecture with the Hippocratic Oath which includes the promise to "never do harm to anyone."

Cast
 Peter Cushing as Dr. Robert Knox
 June Laverick as Martha Knox
 Donald Pleasence as William Hare
 George Rose as William Burke
 Renee Houston as Helen Burke
 Dermot Walsh as Dr. Geoffrey Mitchell
 Billie Whitelaw as Mary Patterson
 John Cairney as Chris Jackson
 Melvyn Hayes as Daft Jamie
 June Powell as Maggie O'Hara
 Andrew Faulds as Inspector McCulloch
 Philip Leaver as Dr. Elliott
 George Woodbridge as Dr. Ferguson
 Garard Green as Dr. Andrews
 Esma Cannon as Aggie
 Raf De La Torre as Grave Robber
 Steven Berkoff as Medical student (uncredited)

Production
Writer/ Producer John Gilling, along with producers Robert S. Baker and Monty Berman of Tempean Films, formed Triad Productions specifically to make the film. It was the first horror movie to feature newly minted horror star Peter Cushing that was not produced by Hammer Films.

Gilling had previously written a film about Burke and Hare entitled The Greed of William Hart in 1948. At that time, however, the British Board of Film Censors demanded that all references to the real-life killers were removed, and so Gilling was forced to rename the killers and several other key characters. The Flesh and the Fiends restores the correct historical names and begins with the text: "[this] is a story of vice and murder. We make no apologies to the dead. It is all true." However, the filmmakers were still not permitted to use Burke and Hare's name in the title, and chief censor John Trevelyan called Baker to his office to discuss his concerns about several "potentially offensive sequences," though the film was ultimately passed uncut with an "X" rating.

To minimize any similarities to Gilling's previous film (and to the then-unproduced script on the same subject by Dylan Thomas, which would eventually be produced in 1985 as The Doctor and the Devils), the film's producers brought in Leon Griffiths to rewrite Gilling's original screenplay.

In his autobiography, Cushing—who had been catapulted to fame by his portrayal of Victor Frankenstein in 1957's The Curse of Frankenstein—compared the role of Dr. Knox to his most famous character: "Now it seemed to me that Knox and 'Frankenstein' had a lot in common. The minds of these exceptional men were driven by a single desire: to inquire into the unknown. Ahead of their time, like most great scientists, their work and motives were misunderstood."

The drooping left eye which Cushing uses in his performance (emphasized in many of the film's posters, though not in the American one) is accurate to the real Dr. Knox, who had his left eye destroyed and his face disfigured by smallpox he contracted as an infant.

Reception
The film has been described alternately as a "box office disappointment," or a film which did "average business." It received mixed reviews upon its initial release; Variety praised Cushing's performance as a "most effective study in single-minded integrity which knits the film together admirably," while Film and Filming'''s Ian Moss criticized the film, writing "I can't understand anyone wishing to see this film voluntarily," and arguing that the script afforded the characters no depth."

In recent years, it has enjoyed something of a stronger critical reappraisal as a cult film. Reviewing the 2001 DVD release by Image Entertainment, critic Glenn Erickson praised the acting as "first rate," and added, "The production values of The Flesh and the Fiends outshine the House of Hammer.... The film is lacking in outright grue and gore but the tone is perfect."

Versions

Several Cuts of the film have circulated in different markets. The currently available DVD from Image Entertainment lists the runtime for the "uncut" original theatrical version at 94 minutes, with a slightly extended "Continental" version—produced for European markets with more permissive censors—running at 95 minutes and including short sequences or alternate takes with more nudity. The film was released by Valiant in the USA under the titles Mania and Psycho Killers using the British theatrical cut, but a later 1965 re-release by Pacemaker Pictures under the title The Fiendish Ghouls cut 23 minutes from the film's runtime. Both the UK and the continental cuts of the film are included on the DVD from Image Entertainment.

See also
 The Greed of William Hart (1948)
 Burke & Hare (1971)
 The Doctor and the Devils (1985)
 Burke & Hare'' (Comedy, 2010)

References

External links

1960 films
1960 horror films
1960s serial killer films
British horror films
British serial killer films
Films directed by John Gilling
Biographical films about serial killers
Films about physicians
Films set in the 1820s
Films set in Edinburgh
Cultural depictions of William Burke and Hare
Grave-robbing in film
1960s English-language films
1960s British films